Blanchard is an unincorporated community in Hardin County, in the U.S. state of Ohio.

History
Blanchard was founded in 1892 when the railroad was extended to that point. The community lies within Blanchard Township, which was named for the Blanchard River. A post office was established at Blanchard in 1894, and remained in operation until 1911.

References

Unincorporated communities in Hardin County, Ohio
1892 establishments in Ohio
Populated places established in 1892
Unincorporated communities in Ohio